Mont-Dauphin is a commune in the Hautes-Alpes department in southeastern France.

At the confluence of Durance and Guil rivers, overlooking the impressive canyon of the latter flowing down from Queyras valleys, Mont-Dauphin is one of the many places fortified by Vauban in the second half of the 17th century.

In 2008, the place forte of Mont-Dauphin, was listed as a UNESCO World Heritage Site, as part of the "Fortifications of Vauban" group.

Population

See also
Communes of the Hautes-Alpes department

References

External links

 Official site
 Website of the fortifications Centre des monuments nationaux
 MontDauphin.com : webcams, meteo, pictures, everything about Vauban's Castle (French)
 Webpage about the fortifications

Montdauphin
Enclaves and exclaves
Vauban fortifications in France